Annie Koutrakis  (born November 22, 1960) is a Canadian Liberal politician who was elected as a Member of Parliament (MP) in the House of Commons of Canada to represent the federal riding of Vimy during the 2019 Canadian federal election, and was re-elected in the 2021 Canadian Federal Election. Koutrakis was appointed Parliamentary Secretary to the Minister of Transport in 2021. Prior to becoming a Member of Parliament, she worked in investment firms for 30 years.

Biography 
Koutrakis was born in Montreal and lived in Laval for 26 years. She received her Diploma in Social Sciences/Business Administration from Dawson College and has studied Human Resources Management at Concordia University. She is fluently trilingual (French, English, and Greek).

Koutrakis was elected as the President, CEO, Chair of the executive committee and member of the Board of Directors of the Hellenic Community of Greater Montreal, the first woman to hold this position. She previously served on the Board of CLSC Normand-Bethune, the Hellenic Social Services of Quebec, and the Board of the Hellenic Board of Trade of Montreal. She was Vice President of the Parents Committee at Ecole Démosthènes and served on the Alexandria Fundraising Committee in Laval.

Koutrakis was first elected as an MP in 2019, during the 2019 Canadian federal election. She ran in the riding of Vimy, which is one of the four electoral districts in the city of Laval, Quebec, and won the election with a comfortable margin. She replaced outgoing Liberal MP Eva Nassif, who served as the Liberal MP in the riding from 2015 to 2019.

Koutrakis is a member of the Standing Committee on Finance and a member of the Special Joint Committee on Medical Aid in Dying, a committee made up of Members of Parliament and Senators who are conducting the five-year review of Medical Assistance in Dying in Canada. Koutrakis is also part of various parliamentary associations and interparliamentary groups.

On March 23, 2020, Koutrakis introduced Bill C-276, entitled An Act to designate the Month of March as Hellenic Heritage Month, in the House of Commons.

Electoral record

References

External links

Living people
Canadian people of Greek descent
Members of the House of Commons of Canada from Quebec
Liberal Party of Canada MPs
Politicians from Laval, Quebec
Politicians from Montreal
Women members of the House of Commons of Canada
Women in Quebec politics
21st-century Canadian politicians
21st-century Canadian women politicians
1960 births